Pontogeneia is a genus of fungi within the class Sordariomycetes and Lulworthiomycetidae subclass.

Species
As accepted by Species Fungorum;
 Pontogeneia calospora 
 Pontogeneia codiicola 
 Pontogeneia cubensis 
 Pontogeneia enormis 
 Pontogeneia erikae 
 Pontogeneia microdictyi 
 Pontogeneia padinae 
 Pontogeneia valoniopsidis

References

Sordariomycetes